DAF NV (originally DAF BV) was a holding company formed in April 1987, when DAF Trucks and the Leyland Trucks division of the Rover Group merged. In February 1993, it was placed in receivership.

History
DAF BV was formed on 6 April 1987, when the Dutch DAF Trucks company merged with the Leyland Trucks division of the British Rover Group, which included the van making business of Freight Rover. The new company was jointly owned by DAF Beheer (60%) and Rover Group (40%).

In June 1989, DAF was floated on the Amsterdam and London Stock Exchanges, and renamed DAF NV with DAF Beheer and the Rover Group (now owned by British Aerospace) reducing their shareholdings to 22% and 16% respectively. DAF NV's products were sold under the Leyland DAF banner in the United Kingdom, and as DAF elsewhere.

It manufactured trucks at its plants in Eindhoven and Leyland, and vans at its plant in Birmingham in England. In February 1993, DAF NV was placed in receivership, after a downturn in sales and an inability to refinance, with the business sold in three management buyouts:
DAF Trucks, as a truck manufacturer based in Eindhoven, with the Flemish and Netherlands governments holding the majority of the shares.
LDV Group, as a van manufacturer based in Birmingham, England backed by 3i
Leyland Trucks, as a truck manufacturer based in Leyland, England
DAF Trucks and Leyland Trucks ended up both being acquired by Paccar, while LDV shut down and its intellectual property was acquired by SAIC Motor.

References

Companies formerly listed on Euronext Amsterdam
Companies formerly listed on the London Stock Exchange
Dual-listed companies
Holding companies of the Netherlands
Holding companies established in 1987
Holding companies disestablished in 1993
Rover Company
1980s initial public offerings
Dutch companies established in 1987
Dutch companies disestablished in 1993